Rectortown Historic District is a national historic district located at Rectortown, Fauquier County, Virginia.  It encompasses 76 contributing buildings, 3 contributing sites, and 2 contributing structures in the rural village of Rectortown.  The district includes dwellings dating back to the 18th century, churches, a school, an Odd Fellows hall, a post office, multiple commercial buildings, and
several cemeteries that illustrate the town's growth and development.  Notable buildings include the Maidstone Ordinary (c. 1763), the Rector-Slack Log House, the Ashby House (c. 1800), the Georg Mann House, The Brick Store House (c. 1840), Rector's Warehouse and Station (c. 1835), Denham, Maidstone, Rectortown United Methodist Church (1894), the Jackson-Grant House (1924), Slack's Store (1890), and the Mt. Olive Odd Fellows Lodge (1935).

It was listed on the National Register of Historic Places in 2005.  It is included in the Cromwell's Run Rural Historic District.

References

Historic districts in Fauquier County, Virginia
Federal architecture in Virginia
Greek Revival architecture in Virginia
National Register of Historic Places in Fauquier County, Virginia
Historic districts on the National Register of Historic Places in Virginia